James Higginson may refer to:
 James Higginson (cricketer), English cricketer
 Sir James Macaulay Higginson, Anglo-Irish colonial administrator
 James J. Higginson, American stockbroker and soldier